Carol Stronghilos (June 18, 1925 - October 3, 2010) was an American artist. In 1979, Stronghilos co-founded the New York Feminist Art Institute.

She has exhibited her paintings at the Whitney Museum, the Aldrich Museum, the Newark Museum and the Brooklyn Museum.

Solo exhibitions
1972, Carol Stronghilos, Brooklyn Museum.

References

1925 births
2010 deaths
20th-century American painters
American feminists
Place of birth missing
20th-century American women artists
Women founders
Founders of schools in the United States
American women painters
21st-century American women